"The Seven Joys of Mary" (Roud # 278) is a traditional carol about Mary's happiness at moments in the life of Jesus, probably inspired by the trope of the Seven Joys of the Virgin in the devotional literature and art of Medieval Europe. Though not traditionally associated with Christmas, it has become so in the modern era.

Versions
The song has English and American versions referring to different acts by Jesus that gave joy to Mary:

Tune
The common music is sung thus:

Recordings

The Weavers – We Wish You A Merry Christmas (1951)
Burl Ives – Christmas Day in the Morning (1952)
Maddy Prior and June Tabor – Silly Sisters (1976)
Stephen Cleobury and the King's College Choir (1984, 1999)
Kate & Anna McGarrigle – The McGarrigle Christmas Hour (2005)
John Jacob Niles – An Evening with (remastered 2006)
Great Big Sea – RedEye Holiday Sampler 2008'
Kate Rusby (under the title 'Seven Good Joys') – While Mortals Sleep (2011)
Loreena McKennitt – A Midwinter Night's Dream

See also
 List of Christmas carols

References

Further reading
 Hugh Keyte and Andrew Parrott. The New Oxford Book of Carols. Oxford: Oxford University Press, 1992.
 Ian Bradley. The Penguin Book of Carols. London: Penguin, 1999.

External links
 An Online Christmas Songbook: The Seven Joys of Mary: link

Burl Ives songs
Marian hymns
Christmas carols
Year of song unknown